Silicon Harbor may refer to any of three different high tech and innovation regions:

Hong Kong
Charleston, South Carolina
Atlantic Canada